Baki is a 2018 original net animation series adapted from the manga of the same name written and illustrated by Keisuke Itagaki. It covers the second part of the manga Baki the Grappler series and is directed by Toshiki Hirano at TMS Entertainment with character designs handled by Fujio Suzuki and scripts overseen by Tatsuhiko Urahata. It began streaming on Netflix on June 25, 2018 in Japan, and started streaming on December 18, 2018 outside Japan. The series then started airing on several Japanese television channels beginning with Tokyo MX on July 1. Its opening theme song is "Beastful" by Granrodeo and its ending theme "Resolve" is performed by Azusa Tadokoro with lyrics by Miho Karasawa. The first season focuses on five inmates who break out of prison from around the world and travel to Japan.

Netflix renewed the series for a second season on March 19, 2019. On March 5, 2020, it was announced that the main staff TMS Entertainment would be returning to produce the second season with the addition of a new character designer and art director. The 13 episode second season covering the "Great Chinese Challenge" and the Alai Jr. arcs was released exclusively on Netflix on June 4, 2020. Its opening theme is "Jounetsu wa Oboete Iru" performed by Granrodeo and its ending theme is "Dead Stroke" performed by Ena Fujita.

However, it adapts the arc of the same name from the Baki series. Created by Telecom Animation Film, it was directed by Teiichi Takiguchi.


Series Overview

Episode list

Season 1: Most Evil Death Row Convicts Saga (2018)

Season 2: Great Ratai Tournament/Godlike Clash of the Kids Saga (2020)

OVA

References

Lists of anime episodes
Baki